Wright County is the name of three counties in the United States:

Wright County, Iowa
Wright County, Minnesota
Wright County, Missouri

It is also the name of one company:
Wright County Egg, based in Galt, Iowa

It is also a historic county in Canada:
Wright County, Quebec